Yohanan Levi (1901 – 20 July 1945) was a Hebrew linguist and historian, specialising in the Second Temple period.

Biography 
Levi was born in Berlin, Germany in 1901. He studied at Berlin University and received a doctorate in 1926. He emigrated to Mandate Palestine (now Israel) in 1934 and taught at the Hebrew University of Jerusalem, where he was professor of Roman language and literature. He died, age 44, in 1945. A number of his articles were collected by his students and published some fifteen years after his death.

Awards 
 In 1957, Levi was posthumously awarded the Israel Prize, for the humanities.

References

See also 
List of Israel Prize recipients
Levi

Jewish historians
Hebraists
Humboldt University of Berlin alumni
Academic staff of the Hebrew University of Jerusalem
Israel Prize in humanities recipients
Israel Prize in humanities recipients who were historians
Jewish emigrants from Nazi Germany to Mandatory Palestine
Writers from Berlin
1901 births
1945 deaths
German male non-fiction writers
20th-century German historians